Euphaedra velutina, the velvet Ceres forester, is a butterfly in the family Nymphalidae. It is found in Ghana, Nigeria and western Cameroon. The habitat consists of forests.

References

Butterflies described in 1997
velutina